Robert's was a department store based in Long Beach, California.

The chain began when Morris Burman opened the first store in East Los Angeles. In 1950, Burman bought an existing store in North Long Beach at 5350 Long Beach Blvd., and opened it as the Jones Department Store. In 1951, they opened Robert's at 16630 Bellflower Blvd. in Bellflower.

It had branches in:
Bixby Knolls, Long Beach - opened December 1967, 52,000 sq. ft., 4450 Atlantic Ave., closed in 1994, empty for 15 years, razed only in 2009 to make way for a new Marshall's. The loss of the store was long symbolic of the decline of Bixby Knolls as a retail center
Bellflower, 16630 Bellflower Boulevard
 Burbank (Burcal), 240 N. Golden Mall
East Los Angeles, 4771 Whittier Boulevard (now Fallas Paredes)
La Mirada Mall
Pico Rivera, Whittier Boulevard at Rosemead Boulevard
 Pomona, Indian Hills Mall
Santa Ana, Honer Plaza
Santa Fe Springs, Santa Fe Springs Shopping Center 
West Covina, Eastland Center

References

Defunct department stores based in Greater Los Angeles
Companies based in Long Beach, California